The Château de Mehun-sur-Yèvre is a castle in the town of Mehun-sur-Yèvre in the départment of Cher, France.

The castle has been classified as a monument historique by the French Ministry of Culture since 1840.

History
The existence of a fortification at the site of Mehun-sur-Yèvre dates from antiquity. The major remains are of the early 13th century and the later 14th century. The present standing ruins date from a castle founded under the Courtenays after 1209. This fortress was transformed into a princely residence by John, Duke of Berry in 1367. Largely ruined in the 18th century the castle represented an excellent example of late Gothic architecture and early Renaissance architecture.  Charles VII of France, died in the castle on July 22, 1461.

Description of the castle
The castle is built on a trapezoid plan, and originally had a tall cylindrical tower at each corner and a rectangular tower in the middle of one of the long sides. An entrance was formed in the wall between two of the towers. One tower (12m diameter) was much larger than the others (8m) and served as the keep. The keep and the west tower still stand to their full height, each capped with intricate defensive machicolations. Manuscript illustrations indicate that the castle also had a large chapel above the principal entrance.

See also
 List of castles in France

References

External links
 Article and photos of the Château de Mehun-sur-Yèvre
 Château de Mehun-sur-Yèvre ( lot pictures, history, in french 

Castles in Centre-Val de Loire
Royal residences in France
Monuments historiques of Centre-Val de Loire